Kroczyce  is a village in Zawiercie County, Silesian Voivodeship, in southern Poland. It is the seat of the gmina (administrative district) called Gmina Kroczyce.

The village has a population of 1,500.

References

Kroczyce
Kielce Governorate
Kielce Voivodeship (1919–1939)